Gustavia dodsonii is a species of woody plant in the family Lecythidaceae. It is found only in Ecuador. Its natural habitats are subtropical or tropical moist lowland forests and subtropical or tropical moist montane forests.  Its most remarkable feature are its seeds, which can measure up to 2.9 inches (74 mm) in length by up to 2.25 inches (58mm) in diameter.

References

dodsonii
Flora of Ecuador
Endangered plants
Taxonomy articles created by Polbot